Preeti Singh (born 26 October 1971) is an Indian author based at Chandigarh. Singh has been working as a professional writer since last 21 years before authoring her four best-selling novels. Her debut novel - Flirting With Fate was published by Mahaveer Publishers, India in 2012, followed by Crossroads, which was published by Authors Press, India, in 2014. Her second book Crossroads has made its place in the India Book Of Records as the First Indian Fiction having real-life people as characters.

On 17 December 2015, she was felicitated with the Swayamsiddha Award for self-made women who have been self achievers in their fields, by the Anupama Foundation, Lucknow. Her third crime thriller novel Watched, published by Omji Publishing House, released in October 2016. Her 4th book is on Epilepsy awareness, released in November 2020 by Vitastaa Publishers.

Biography
Singh belongs to an army family. Her father Major General Kulwant Singh retired from the Indian Army and her late mother, Sonya Kulwant Singh died due to lung cancer. Though she is an epileptic since birth, Singh grew with an urge to overcome her handicap someday, which she successfully did with the launch of her debut novel. Singh completed her schooling from La Martiniere School, Lucknow. She then graduated from MCM DAV College for Women, Chandigarh, with an English honours and pursued her master's degree in English literature from Punjab University, Chandigarh. Singh acquired a postgraduate diploma in journalism and mass communication from IGNOU, Delhi and began her career as an editor with Amity University, Noida. After completing her B.Ed. (Bachelor of Education) from Annamalai University, she began teaching in army schools all over India before joining an SEO Company as a creative content writer. She is now settled in Chandigarh with her family and freelances as an editor for a wide clientele, globally.

In April 2019, Preeti Singh and her epileptic dog named Sizzler Singh were interviewed by The Tribune on how dogs can sense and warn family members just before an epileptic seizure is about to happen.

Works
Singh debuted with a crime thriller Flirting With Fate released by Mahaveer Publishers in 2012.  The book was awarded the Best Debut Crime Fiction of 2012 Crossroads is an attempt at tapping the emotional aspect of women undergoing domestic abuse and suffering. The book is unique as it holds real-life people with real names, from various cities, as the main characters.

Singh is a core member of Helping Souls, a Panchkula-based NGO, working towards making animal shelters as well as improving the living standards of slum women and children.

Her third crime thriller novel Watched released in October 2016. Her fourth book, Of Epilepsy Butterflies by Vitastaa Publishers was released on November 8, 2020 in Chandigarh and has the struggles and victories of eight epilepsy warriors. In March 2022, Singh unveiled her book, Of Epilepsy Butterflies to raise awareness on epilepsy at Fortis Hospital in Mohali.

Awards and recognition
 Nominated for the Commonwealth Booker's Prize 2012 and also Awarded the Best Debut Crime Fiction Novel of 2012
 Featured in the Coffee Table Book Of Leading Personalities of Chandigarh released by Aneesh Bhanot
 Her novel Crossroads has made its place in the India Book Of Records as the First Indian Fiction having real life people as characters.
 She was felicitated with the Swayamsiddha Award for self made women who have been self achievers in their fields, by the Anupama Foundation, Lucknow, on 17 December 2015.
 She has been given the Best Author Award 2016 for Sanmati Literary Awards 2016 for her novel Crossroads by Pawan Jain and The Aagman Family in Delhi.
 Singh was facilitated with the Bharat Nirman Literary Excellence Award 2017 for Writing at the 5th Asiad Literature Festival on 17 September 2017 in the Press Club Chandigarh.
 Preeti Singh was invited as one of the eminent speakers amongst other dignitaries like Shabana Azmi and Kalki Subramaniam at the Women Leadership Conclave hosted by FMRT, New Delhi on 30 September 2018.
 Her fourth book ‘Of Epilepsy Butterflies’ was chosen as the best non-fiction by the A3 Foundation for Literary Award winners of 2020-21.

See also
 List of Indian writers

References

External links

The Road Less Travelled, The Indian Express
Strong Enough To Fight Alone, Daily Post India
Interview with Day & Night News
"Thriller Debut", Hindustan Times

English-language writers from India
Indian women novelists
Indian thriller writers
Living people
1971 births
Women thriller writers
People from Ambala
Writers from Chandigarh
21st-century Indian novelists
21st-century Indian women writers
Women writers from Chandigarh
Novelists from Haryana
Women writers from Haryana